The World Food Programme (WFP) is an international organization within the United Nations that provides food assistance worldwide. It is the world's largest humanitarian organization and the leading provider of school meals. Founded in 1961, WFP is headquartered in Rome and has offices in 80 countries. As of 2021, it supported over 128 million people across more than 120 countries and territories.

In addition to emergency food relief, WFP offers technical and development assistance, such as building capacity for emergency preparedness and response, managing supply chains and logistics, promoting social safety programs, and strengthening resilience against climate change. It also a major provider of direct cash assistance and medical supplies, and provides passenger services for humanitarian workers.

WFP is an executive member of the United Nations Sustainable Development Group, a consortium of UN entities that aims to fulfil the 17 Sustainable Development Goals (SDG), with a priority on achieving SDG 2 for "zero hunger" by 2030.

The World Food Programme was awarded the Nobel Peace Prize in 2020 for its efforts to provide food assistance in areas of conflict, and to prevent the use of food as a weapon of war and conflict.

History
WFP was established in 1961 after the 1960 Food and Agriculture Organization (FAO) Conference, when George McGovern, director of the US Food for Peace Programmes, proposed establishing a multilateral food aid programme. WFP launched its first programmes in 1963 by the FAO and the United Nations General Assembly on a three-year experimental basis, supporting the Nubian population at Wadi Halfa in Sudan. In 1965, the programme was extended to a continuing basis.

Background 
WFP works across a broad spectrum of Sustainable Development Goals, owing to the fact that food shortages, hunger, malnutrition and foodborne illness cause poor health, which subsequently impacts other areas of sustainable development, such as education, employment and poverty (Sustainable Development Goals Four, Eight and One respectively).

Funding
WFP operations are funded by voluntary donations principally from governments of the world, and also from corporations and private donors. In 2021, funding was a record USD 9.6 billion – 15 percent higher than in 2020 – against a funding need of USD 14.8 billion. That year, the United States was the largest donor.

Organization

Governance, leadership and staff
WFP is governed by an executive board which consists of representatives from 36 member states, and provides intergovernmental support, direction and supervision of WFP's activities. The European Union is a permanent observer in WFP and, as a major donor, participates in the work of its executive board. WFP is headed by an executive director, who is appointed jointly by the UN Secretary-General and the director-general of the Food and Agriculture Organization (FAO) of the United Nations. The executive director is appointed for fixed five-year terms and is responsible for the administration of the organization as well as the implementation of its programmes, projects and other activities. David Beasley, previously Governor of the U.S. state of South Carolina, was appointed to the role in March 2017. He heads the WFP secretariat, which is headquartered in Rome.

In September 2021, WFP had over 21,000 staff.

List of executive directors 
Since 1992, all executive directors have been American. The following is a chronological list of those who have served as executive director of the World Food Programme:

Addeke Hendrik Boerma (May 1962 – December 1967)
Sushil K. Dev (January 1968 – August 1968) (acting)
Francisco Aquino (July 1968 – May 1976)
Thomas C. M. Robinson (May 1976 – June 1977 acting; July 1977 – September 1977)
Garson N. Vogel (October 1977 – April 1981)
Bernardo de Azevedo Brito (May 1981 – February 1982) (acting)
Juan Felipe Yriart (February 1982 – April 1982) (acting)
James Ingram (April 1982 – April 1992)
Catherine Bertini (April 1992 – April 2002)
James T. Morris (April 2002 – April 2007)
Josette Sheeran (April 2007 – April 2012)
Ertharin Cousin (April 2012 – April 2017)
David Beasley (April 2017 – present)

Activities

Emergencies
About two-thirds of WFP life-saving food assistance goes to people facing severe food crises, most of them caused by conflict. In September 2022, WFP warned of record numbers of people who were either starving already or facing starvation. The latest Hunger Hotspots report, co-published by WFP and FAO, reported that 970,000 people faced catastrophic levels of hunger in five countries, namely: Afghanistan, Ethiopia, South Sudan, Somalia and Yemen. That is a tenfold increase in a decade. Nigeria, with rising violence and restricted humanitarian access, is also highlighted as a country of greatest concern. WFP said it had "scaled up direct food and nutrition assistance to prevent famine and aims to reach a record 153 million people in 2022.

WFP is also a first responder to sudden-onset emergencies. When floods struck Sudan in July 2020, it provided emergency food assistance to nearly 160,000 people. WFP provided food as well as vouchers for people to buy vital supplies, while also planning recovery, reconstruction and resilience-building activities, after Cyclone Idai struck Mozambique and floods washed an estimated 400,000 hectares of crops on early 2019.

WFP's emergency is also pre-emptive, in offsetting the potential impact of disasters. In the Sahel region of Africa, amidst economic challenges, climate change and armed militancy, WFP's activities included working with communities and partners to harvest water for irrigation and restore degraded land, and supporting livelihoods through skills training. It uses early-warning systems to help communities prepare for disasters. In Bangladesh, weather forecasting led to distributions of cash to vulnerable farmers to pay for measures such as reinforcing their homes or stockpiling food ahead of heavy flooding.

WFP is the lead agency of the Logistics Cluster, a coordination mechanism established by the Inter-Agency Standing Committee (IASC).  It also co-leads the Food Security Cluster. The WFP-managed United Nations Humanitarian Air Service (UNHAS) serves over 300 destinations globally. WFP also manages the United Nations Humanitarian Response Depot (UNHRD), a global network of hubs that procures, stores and transports emergency supplies for the organization and the wider humanitarian community. WFP logistical support, including its air service and hubs, has enabled staff and supplies from WFP and partner organizations to reach areas where commercial flights have not been available, during the COVID-19 pandemic.

Climate change

WFP provided cash to vulnerable groups ahead of torrential rains in Bangladesh in July 2019.  WFP's response to Hurricane Dorian in the Bahamas in September 2019 was assisted by a regional office in Barbados, which had been set up the previous year to enable better disaster preparedness and response. In advance of Hurricane Dorian, WFP deployed technical experts in food security, logistics and emergency telecommunication, to support a rapid needs assessment. Assessment teams also conducted an initial aerial reconnaissance mission, with the aim of putting teams on the ground as soon as possible.

Nutrition
WFP works with governments, other UN agencies, NGOs and the private sector, supporting nutrition interventions, policies and programmes that include school meals and food fortification.

School feeding

School meals encourage parents in vulnerable families to send their children to school, rather than work. They have proved highly beneficial in areas including education and gender equality, health and nutrition, social protection, local economies and agriculture. WFP works with partners to ensure school feeding is part of integrated school health and nutrition programmes, which include services such as malaria control, menstrual hygiene and guidance on sanitation and hygiene.

Smallholder farmers
WFP connects smallholder farmers to markets in more than 40 countries.

In 2008, WFP coordinated the five-year Purchase for Progress (P4P) pilot project. P4P assists smallholding farmers by offering them opportunities to access agricultural markets and to become competitive players in the marketplace. The project spanned across 20 countries in Africa, Asia, and Latin America and trained 800,000 farmers in improved agricultural production, post-harvest handling, quality assurance, group marketing, agricultural finance, and contracting with WFP. The project resulted in 366,000 metric tons of food produced and generated more than US$148 million in income for its smallholder farmers.

Asset creation
WFP's Food Assistance for Assets (FFA) programme provides cash or food-based transfers to address recipients' immediate food needs, while they build or boost assets, such as repairing irrigation systems, bridges, land and water management activities.

FFA reflects WFP's drive towards food assistance and development rather than food aid and dependency. It does this by placing a focus on the assets and their impact on people and communities rather than on the work to realize them, representing a shift away from the previous approaches such as Food or Cash for Work programmes and large public works programmes.

Cash assistance

WFP uses cash transfers such as physical banknotes, a debit card or vouchers, aiming to give more choice to aid recipients and encourage the funds to be invested back into local economies. During the first half of 2022, WFP delivered US$1.6 billion in cash to 37 million people in 70 countries to alleviate hunger. A 2022 study by the Oxford Poverty and Human Development Initiative concluded that the Emergency Social Safety Net (ESSN) cash programme "significantly reduced the incidence and intensity of multidimensional poverty" among the people receiving cash transfers.

Capacity building
In the most climate disaster-prone provinces of the Philippines, WFP is providing emergency response training and equipment to local government units, and helping set up automated weather stations.

Digital innovation
WFP's digital transformation centres on deploying the latest technologies and data to help achieve zero hunger. WFP's Munich-based Innovation Accelerator has sourced and supported more than 60 projects spanning 45 countries. In 2017, WFP launched the Building Blocks programme. It aims to distribute money-for-food assistance to Syrian refugees in Jordan. The project uses blockchain technology to digitize identities and allow refugees to receive food with eye scanning. WFP's low-tech hydroponics kits allow refugees to grow barley that feed livestock in the Sahara desert. The SMP PLUS software is an AI-powered menu creation tool for school meals programmes worldwide

Partnerships

WFP works with governments, private sector, UN agencies, international finance groups, academia, and more than 1,000 non-governmental organisations. The WFP, the UN Food and Agriculture Organization, and the International Fund for Agricultural Development reaffirmed their joint efforts to end global hunger, particularly amid the impacts of the COVID-19 pandemic, during a joint meeting of their governing bodies in October 2020. In the United States, Washington, D.C.-based 501(c)(3) organization World Food Program USA supports the WFP. The American organisation frequently donates to the WFP, though the two are separate entities for taxation purposes.

Reviews

Recognition and awards
WFP won the 2020 Nobel Peace Prize for its "efforts for combating hunger", its "contribution to creating peace in conflicted-affected areas," and for acting as a driving force in efforts to prevent the use of food as a weapon of war and conflict. Receiving the award, Executive David Beasley called for billionaires to "step up" and help source the US$5 billion WFP needs to save 30 million people from famine.

Challenges

In 2018, the Center for Global Development ranked WFP last in a study of 40 aid programmes, based on indicators grouped into four themes: maximising efficiency, fostering institutions, reducing burdens, and transparency and learning. These indicators relate to aid effectiveness principles developed at the Paris Declaration on Aid Effectiveness (2005), the Accra Agenda for Action (2008), and the Busan Partnership Agreement (2011).

There is wide general debate on the net effectiveness of aid, including unintended consequences such as increasing the duration of conflicts, and increasing corruption. WFP faces difficult decisions on working with some regimes.

Some surveys have shown internal culture problems at WFP, including sexual harassment.

See also

 Asia Emergency Response Facility, a WFP special operation to establish an emergency response facility in Asia
 Fight Hunger, a WFP initiative to end child hunger by 2015 
 Food Force, an educational game published by WFP
 Network for Capacity Development in Nutrition
 World Food Council, a defunct UN agency absorbed by FAO and WFP

Notes

References

External links
 
 
 
 

World Food Programme
Government agencies established in 1961
Government agencies established in 1963
International medical and health organizations
Organizations awarded Nobel Peace Prizes
United Nations Development Group
Italy and the United Nations
Hunger relief organizations
Organisations based in Rome
Malnutrition organizations
Agriculture in society